Saint-Étienne-en-Coglès (pronounced as Saint-Étienne-en-Cogles) is a former commune in the Ille-et-Vilaine department of Brittany in northwestern France. On 1 January 2017, it was merged into the new commune Maen Roch.

Population
Inhabitants of Saint-Étienne-en-Coglès are called stéphanais in French.

See also
Communes of the Ille-et-Vilaine department

References

External links

Former communes of Ille-et-Vilaine